Roy Contout (born 11 February 1985) is a French Guianan international footballer.

Career 
Contout began his career with Beauvais and signed in summer 2004 for FC Metz. After three years with Metz, Contout signed for Amiens SC in summer 2007.
On 16 July 2009 Auxerre signed the striker on a free transfer. During his time with Auxerre he scored a memorable double at high-flying Lille in a 2–1 victory on 28 February 2010. He also played in the UEFA Champions League before leaving for Sochaux on 13 July 2012 after Auxerre's relegation from Ligue 1.

After 2 seasons in yellow, the next club for Contout was Mouscron-Péruwelz of Belgium, whom he joined on 1 September 2014 after being released following Sochaux's relegation to Ligue 2. Following his release from Mouscron in 2015, Contout joined Moroccan side RS Berkane on a free transfer.

International goals
Scores and results list French Guiana's goal tally first.

Honors
French Guiana
Caribbean Cup bronze:2017

References

External links

1985 births
Living people
Sportspeople from Cayenne
French people of French Guianan descent
French Guianan footballers
French footballers
AS Beauvais Oise players
Ligue 1 players
Ligue 2 players
FC Metz players
Amiens SC players
AJ Auxerre players
FC Sochaux-Montbéliard players
Association football forwards
French Guiana international footballers
2014 Caribbean Cup players
2017 CONCACAF Gold Cup players
Belgian Pro League players
Botola players
RS Berkane players